Reverend Ho Yeow Sun, better known as Sun Ho, is a Singaporean Christian pastor and co-founder of City Harvest Church, and former Mandopop singer.

Early life
Ho studied at Anglican High School and Victoria Junior College. Born in Singapore, she started as a pastor when she was 20 years old with her husband, Kong Hee, founding City Harvest Church. Eight years later she moved to Taiwan, where she became a Mandopop singer.

Career
Ho is one of the co-founders of City Harvest Church and its community services and is married to Kong Hee. Ho also led City Harvest Church's Creative Department from 1992 until late 2000, when she resigned and relocated to Taiwan, where she would do most of her recordings, to pursue her singing career. At the beginning of her music career, she faced accusations that her dressing and song lyrics were sexually charged and inappropriate for her religious background, and rumours of her using her church's support to aid in album sales. After a series of concerts, she had the opportunity to further develop her career outside of Singapore, focusing on China, Taiwan and the US.

From 2002 to 2007, Ho, based in Taiwan, released a succession of five Mandarin pop albums through Warner Music Taiwan, that have either reached double or triple platinum status. During this five-year period, Ho worked with composers such as Ma Yufen (马毓芬), the late Ma Zhaojun (马兆骏) F.I.R., Milk, Arys Chien (深白色), Lee Wei Song (李伟菘), and Tan Han Jin (陈奂仁). "Lonely Travel" was ranked No. 1 on nine top music charts. Her next album "Gain" released in 2006 reached No. 1 position on 10 top music charts. In 2007, Ho released "Embrace" which hit No. 1 on 11 top music charts. Her song, "Starting Point", was used as theme song for Singapore TV series "Turning Point" based on real-life inspirational stories, of which Ho was the host.

In 2003, Ho broke into Hollywood with her debut American single "Where Did Love Go," produced by David Foster and Peter Rafelson. The song reached No. 1 on the Billboard's Hot Dance Club Play "Breakout" Chart in December 2003. Subsequently, three of her singles, "One With You", "Without Love" and "Gone" reached No. 1 positions on the Billboard Dance Chart. "Ends Of The Earth" also joined the abovementioned three singles to reach No. 1 positions on the UK MusicWeek Chart. While in the United States, Ho worked with top industry personalities such as Wyclef Jean, Diane Warren, David Foster, Jimmy Harry, Tony Moran, Chris Cox, Eric Kupper, Jason Nevins, Moto Blanco and the Underdogs.

Ho returned back to Singapore from 2010 and resumed back her pastoral duties at City Harvest Church. In 2015, she was ordained and given the title Reverend and the position of the Executive Pastor. In 2018, she co-founded The Harvest Network (THN) together with Rev Dr Bobby Chaw to help City Harvest Church to connect to other like-minded Churches around the region.

Awards
On 6 November 2003, Ho was among 10 international nominees to be presented "The Outstanding Young Person of the World 2003" Award for her social work in Asia. The ceremony was held in Copenhagen, Denmark, under the auspices of JCI (Junior Chamber International). Ho is the fourth Asian celebrity to receive the award after Jacky Cheung, Andy Lau and Michelle Yeoh.

Controversy

In 2010, Sun Ho was questioned by the Government of Singapore when City Harvest Church came under investigation for alleged misuse of funds.

After the City Harvest Church trial began which created an extended scrutiny of Ho's singing career, two suspension orders were imposed against her where "Ms Ho is not involved even though she is a direct beneficiary". She resumed her role as the Executive Director of the church in Singapore after they were lifted in May 2013 by the Commissioner of Charities (COC).

On 19 October 2015, two days  before the sentencing of her husband Kong Hee, Ho was ordained by Michael Scales from Nyack College. The ordination paved the way for Ho to lead the church as senior pastor while her husband awaited a potential prison sentence.

Two days later, all six City Harvest Church leaders were sentenced to between 21 months and eight years' jail on Friday (20 November) for misappropriating S$50 million of church funds as well as criminal breach of trust, and falsification of accounts.

Ho's husband, senior pastor Kong Hee, the founder of the church, was sentenced to eight years' imprisonment for criminal breach of trust. John Lam, former secretary of the church's management board, was sentenced to three years' jail. Sharon Tan, former finance manager, was sentenced to 21 months in prison. Former board member Chew Eng Han was given a sentence of six years and senior pastor Tan Ye Peng, five years and six months. Serina Wee, former finance manager for the church, was handed a five-year jail term.

The November 2016 appeal revealed the City Harvest Church leaders spent $24 million on Ms Sun Ho’s musical foray into the United States which included a house in Hollywood that cost $28,000 a month in rent; a whole entourage of staff; a $1.9 million paycheck to rapper Wyclef Jean to produce the "China Wine" video; as well as another $500,000 to sweep up her albums when they tanked.

Over the course of the trial, the court heard that Kong Hee had set up a multi-purpose account where church members deposited "love gifts" that were used to pay for expenses between 2006 and 2010.

Examples of expenses included more than $300,000 spent on travel, more than $100,000 on food, and over $100,000 on make-up and medical costs. Ho's earnings of more than $400,000 a year came from these gifts, and Kong admitted in court that donors were unaware of Ho's earnings. The 2012 Commissioner of Charities (COC) inquiry found that $3 million was purportedly spent by Sun Ho from the MPA between April 2007 and March 2010. Givers to the MPA were not told the Crossover project was in fact funded by illegal bonds and were persuaded to give towards the project's costs. Besides Sun's 'salary' from the MPA of $400,000/year, Sun was receiving an official salary from Xtron at US$10,000/mth and entitled to 25% of project gross income, regardless and before costs.

Today, Sun Ho continues to sit on the Board of City Harvest Church.

Personal life
Together with husband Kong Hee, Ho has one son, Dayan Kong, who was born in 2005.

Ho formerly lived in a 5,242 sq ft duplex penthouse located on the 11th floor of The Oceanfront in the premium residential enclave Sentosa Cove. The penthouse was co-owned by her husband with Indonesian tycoon Wahju Hanafi, a church follower. The pair bought the penthouse for $9.33 million in 2007, each paying monthly installments of $17,000, before the apartment was sold at a loss of over S$2 million to a Kenyan diplomat.

Depiction in popular culture
In August 2016, blogger and online television personality Xiaxue lampooned Ho with a makeup tutorial inspired by her look in the controversial "Mr Bill" music video.

Discography
Sun With Love (2002)
Sun*day (2002)
Lonely Travel (2003)
Gain (2006)
Embrace (2007)

References

Living people
Dance musicians
Victoria Junior College alumni
Singaporean Charismatics
21st-century Singaporean women singers
Singaporean Mandopop singers
Warner Music Group artists
1972 births